The Revenu de solidarité active (RSA) is a French form of in work welfare benefit aimed at reducing the barrier to return to work. It was implemented on 1 June 2009 by the French government.

RSA replaces the Revenu minimum d'insertion; its goal is to provide a minimum income for unemployed and underemployed workers, with the aim of encouraging them to find work, and provide a complement for low-wage workers so that they do not suffer the perverse effects of earning less through employment than unemployment.

RSA is also intended to replace Allocation de parent isolé (API) and ultimately various other government-sponsored back-to-work incentives and initiatives such as contrat unique d'insertion, contrat d'accompagnement dans l'emploi and contrat initiative emploi.

As of 1 April 2020, the monthly RSA allocation is €550.93 for a single person.

Although the initial programme applied only to workers over the age of 25, "La loi de finances pour 2010 (article 135)" extended benefits to young people aged 18 to 25 who have worked the equivalent of at least two years over the preceding three calendar years.

Calculation

If a person's revenue from work does not reach the RSA threshold, the state pays a negative income tax to the employee. It is the difference between the RSA and the person's own earnings. It is intended to prevent work disincentives.

Amount
The monthly RSA benefit decreases as the income from work increases until the income from work reaches the minimum wage, €17,451 per person in 2014.

See also 

Revenu minimum d'insertion
Guaranteed minimum income
Poverty in France
Working tax credit

References

Further reading 

 Allegre, G. (2011) Le RSA: distribution vers les travailleurs pauvres et offre de travail. Revue de l’OFCE 118(Juillet): 33–62.
 Anne, D. and L’horty, Y. (2002) Transferts sociaux locaux et retour à l'emploi. Economie et Statistique 30(février): 357–358.
 Denis, A. and L’horty, Y. (2012) Revenu de solidarité active (RSA) et incitations au retour à l’emploi en France. Revue internationale de sécurité sociale 65(3): 85–112.
 Eydoux, A. and Tuchszirer, C. (2011) Du RMI au RSA: la difficile mise en place d'une gouvernance décentralisée des politiques d'insertion. Revue française des affaires sociales 4(4): 90–113.
 Mongin, P. (2008) Sur le Revenu de Solidarité Active. Revue d'économie politique 118(3): 433–474.

Economy of France
Welfare in France